Edelweiss (born 1 September 1977 in Tyumen, Russia) is a Russian-Bulgarian actress, TV host, erotic model and former pornographic actress. She lives in Italy and is married to the Bulgarian photographer Aleksandar "Alex" Lomski.

Biography
Edelweiss was born 1 September 1977, in Tyumen, Russia. For 15 years, she lived in Italy with her Bulgarian husband, the photographer Aleksandar "Alex" Lomski, who is also a former pornographic film actor. Edelweiss met her future husband Aleksandar in Bulgaria.
In 2006, she posed for the Bulgarian edition of Playboy magazine. In 2013, she participated in VIP Brother 5.

Television appearances 
 Satyricon (Rai 2) all episodes 
 Libero with Teo Mammucari (Rai 2) two episodes
 Le iene (Italia 1) six episodes
 Ciao Darwin (Canale 5) two episodes
 Lucignolo (Italia 1) four episodes
 Maurizio Costanzo Show (Canale 5) nine episodes
 Bay Bay Baby (Rai 2) all episodes
 Markette (La Sette) one episode
 Verissimo (Canale 5) two episodes
 Studio aperto (Italia 1) 
 Gente di notte (Rai 1)
 Striscia la notizia (Canale 5)
 VIP Brother 5 (2013, Nova television)

Filmography

Mainstream films
 E adesso sesso (2001, Carlo Vanzina)
 Andata e ritorno (2003, Alessandro Paci)
 Un medico in famiglia (2005, serie TV)
 Un ciclone in famiglia (2005, serie TV)
 Il ritorno del Monnezza (2005, Carlo Vanzina)
 Lycantropus (2006, Pasquale Fanetti)
 Un'estate ai Caraibi (2009, Carlo Vanzina)
 Ex - Amici come prima! (2011, Carlo Vanzina)
 Good as You (2012, Carlo Vanzina)

Pornographic films
 Bellissima
 Divina (2006)
 Desideri bagnati
 Desiderando Edelweiss
 Fantastica Edelweiss (2006)
 Edelweiss è Magica
 I sogni di Edelweiss
 Le voglie di Edelweiss (2007)
 Sapore di sesso
 Mente Criminale (2007)
 Edelweiss Troia più che Mai
 Edelweiss Superporca
 Sandy & Edelweiss Insatiables

References

External links
 
 

1977 births
Living people
21st-century Bulgarian actresses
Russian television presenters
Bulgarian television presenters
Big Brother (Bulgarian TV series) contestants
Russian pornographic film actresses
Bulgarian pornographic film actresses
Bulgarian people of Russian descent
People from Tyumen
Russian women television presenters
Bulgarian women television presenters